Hacıkışla is a village in Hendek district, Sakarya Province of Turkey, with a (2000) population of about 719.

Population 
Most of the people in Hacıkışla are from the Black Sea coast of Turkey. A lot of hazelnut is grown here due to the Black Sea ancestry. There is a stadium and a soccer team. The team plays in the Turkish Amateur League and is called Hacıkışlaspor.

Geography 

References 

Hacıkışla köyünün tarihi çok eski zamanlara dayanmasına rağmeneski hac yolu üzerinde bulunması ve eski süleymaniye (bugünkü göl havzası ve etrafı) ormanının bitişi ve çam dağının başlangıcı olması hasebiyle hacıların konakladığı yer olmuştur. Köyün adının 
da buradan geldiği tahmin edilmektedir. Köyümüz Bizans zamanında ve sonrasında Rum köyü olup bugün köy yeri diye tabir edilen yerde kurulmuştur. Bu yerleşim yeri bugünlerde fındık tarlaları olarak kullnılmaktadır. Buralar eski isimlerini muhafaza ederek maşaddere, kilise dere, köy yeri gibi isimlerle günümüzde de anılmaktadır.Bu tarihlere ait kalıntılar gerek fındık tarlalarında, gerekse ormanlık arazilerde dumbutlarda (diğer birifade ile eski rum beylerinin mezarları) bulunmaktadır. Ama ne  yazık ki ilgisizlikten ve hazine avcıları tarafından bu kalıntılar telef edilmiştir. 

Başka bir rivayete göre de Osmanlı İmparatoru sultan AbdulAziz tarafından bugün Soğuksu köyünde, Sivritepe köyünde ve Aktefek 
Köyünde de sülalelerinin devamları bulunan çerkez beylerine hediye edilmiş (1875-1878) ve daha sonraki günlerde 1890 yılında karadenizden (Trabzon - Sürmene - Köprübaşı vb) buraya çalışmak için gelen şimdiki mevcut halkın dedeleri tarafından çerkez beylerinden satın alınmıştır. Bu topraklar 1949 yılına kadar Soğuksu köyünün bir mahallessi konumundaymış. 1949 yılında çıkan yasadan sonra köy vasfını kazanmıştır. Köyümüz bunun dışında çeşitli zamanlarda da göç almış.ve bugünkü mevcut durum ortaya çıkmıştır.

External links 
Online map
Village website

Villages in Sakarya Province